The 2022 season is the 113th in the history of the South Sydney Rabbitohs. Coached by Jason Demetriou and captained by Cameron Murray, they compete in the National Rugby League's 2022 Telstra Premiership.

Pre-Season

Season Summary

Ladder

Ladder progression 

 Numbers highlighted in green indicate that the team finished the round inside the top eight.
 Numbers highlighted in blue indicates the team finished first on the ladder in that round.
 Numbers highlighted in red indicates the team finished last place on the ladder in that round.
 Underlined numbers indicate that the team had a bye during that round.

Results 

Source:

Player Statistics 

Source:

See also 

 2022 NRL pre-season results
 2022 NRL season
 2022 NRL season results
 2022 NRL finals series

References 

South Sydney Rabbitohs seasons
South Sydney Rabbitohs